Real (stylized as REAL.) is the third studio album by American metalcore band The Word Alive. It was released on June 10, 2014 through Fearless Records and was produced by Cameron Mizell and John Feldmann. It is the first album to feature drummer Luke Holland.

Background and recording
Vocalist Tyler Smith discussed the sound of the album in an interview stating that the album would feature some of the heaviest songs they have ever written and some of the most melodic with no unclean vocals in some tracks. On December 20, 2013, the band released their first studio update for their forthcoming album with the first update detailing the sound of the guitars on the album.

Critical reception

Real received positive reviews from music critics. At Metacritic, which assigns a normalised rating out of 100 to reviews from mainstream critics, the album has an average score of 75 out of 100 based on 4 reviews, indicating "generally favorable reviews". AllMusic gave the album a positive review saying, "As more and more bands continue to experiment with the fusion of electronic music and metalcore, the Word Alive set themselves apart from the pack with a more nuanced view of how these two styles can complement one another, proving that things don't always need to be pushed to extremes to be interesting or exciting. Because of this, Real is a rare metalcore album with enough depth to demand repeat listening, which definitely won't disappoint the band's die-hard fans."

Brendan Manley of Alternative Press gave the album a 4 out of 5 stars, saying: "It takes serious swagger to be a modern metalcore/post-hardcore band who drop a record called REAL.—a musical shot across the collective bow of fellow contenders and also-rans alike—and Phoenix quintet the Word Alive back up the insinuation with a shock-and-awe barrage of blast beats, blazing guitars and perhaps most crucially, a formidable array of razor-sharp hooks." KillYourStereo gave the album 59 out of 100 and said: "There are elements in REAL. that are new and exciting within the world of The Word Alive, but that world is held down by the giant hand of the metalcore genre, which is starting to sound like more and more of the same with each new release."

Track listing
Adapted from Spotify.

Personnel
Credits adapted from AllMusic.

The Word Alive
 Tyler Smith – lead vocals
 Zack Hansen – guitars, backing vocals, keyboards, programming
 Tony Pizzuti – guitars, backing vocals, keyboards, programming 
 Daniel Shapiro – bass
 Luke Holland – drums

Additional personnel
 Cameron Mizell – production
 John Feldmann – production, composition
 Erik Ron – composition
 Dan Korneff – mixing
 Brad Blackwood – mastering
 Chris Foitle – A&R
 Sal Torres – A&R
 Sam Kaufman – artwork, design
 Jenny Reader – production management

Charts

References

2014 albums
The Word Alive albums
Fearless Records albums
Albums produced by Cameron Mizell
Albums produced by John Feldmann